The Haus der Bayerischen Geschichte (House of Bavarian History) or HdBG was established in 1983 as an authority of the Free State of Bavaria, Germany and, since 1993, has had its permanent headquarters at Augsburg. On 6 October 1998 it was incorporated into the Bavarian State Ministry for Science, Research and Art (Bayerisches Staatsministerium für Wissenschaft, Forschung und Kunst). The German historian Claus Grimm was director from 1983 until 2007.

Sources 
 Ulla-Britta Vollhardt: Geschichtspolitik in Bayern. Das Haus der Bayerischen Geschichte: Idee – Debatte – Institutionalisierung. Utz, München 2003, .

External links 
Official website of the Haus der Bayerischen Geschichte 
Photo archive of the Haus der Bayerischen Geschichte 
Bavarias towns and villages. History - Coats of arms - Links. 
Castles in Bavaria. History - Architecture - Photographs - Plans 
Abbeys in Bavaria. History - Photographs - Writing 

History of Bavaria
Historiography of Germany